Police Bharya ( Policeman's wife) is a Telugu film starring Naresh, Seetha and Gollapudi Maruti Rao. The film was directed by Relangi Narasimha Rao. The film was remade in Kannada as Policena Hendthi.

Cast
Naresh
Seetha
 Anjana
Gollapudi Maruthi Rao
Ahuthi Prasad
Potti Prasad
Srilatha
Dubbing Janaki
Varalakshmi

References

External links

1990s Telugu-language films
Indian comedy-drama films
Films directed by Relangi Narasimha Rao
Films scored by Raj–Koti
Telugu films remade in other languages